The 2022 Legislative Assembly of Penza Oblast election took place on 9–11 September 2022, on common election day. All 36 seats in the Legislative Assembly were up for reelection.

Electoral system
Under current election laws, the Legislative Assembly is elected for a term of five years, with parallel voting. 18 seats are elected by party-list proportional representation with a 5% electoral threshold, with the other half elected in 18 single-member constituencies by first-past-the-post voting. Seats in the proportional part are allocated using the Imperiali quota, modified to ensure that every party list, which passes the threshold, receives at least one mandate ("Tyumen method").

Candidates

Party lists
To register regional lists of candidates, parties need to collect 0.5% of signatures of all registered voters in Penza Oblast.

The following parties were relieved from the necessity to collect signatures:
United Russia
Communist Party of the Russian Federation
A Just Russia — Patriots — For Truth
Liberal Democratic Party of Russia
New People
Russian Party of Pensioners for Social Justice

New People and RPPSS will take part in Penza Oblast legislative election for the first time, while several parties, who participated in the 2017 election, are absent from the ballot: The Greens, Party for Fairness!, Rodina and Party of Social Protection did not file, while Party of Pensioners of Russia and Patriots of Russia had been dissolved prior.

Single-mandate constituencies
18 single-mandate constituencies were formed in Penza Oblast with Penza divided between eight constituencies, Penzensky District, Tamalinsky District and Kuznetsk — each between two, while other administrative divisions were left intact.

To register, candidates in single-mandate constituencies need to collect 3% of signatures of registered voters in the constituency.

Results

|- style="background-color:#E9E9E9;text-align:center;"
! rowspan=2 colspan=2| Party
! colspan=5| Party list
! colspan=2| Constituency
! colspan=2| Total
|-
! width="75"| Votes
! %
! ±pp
! Seats
! +/–
! Seats
! +/–
! Seats
! +/–
|-
| style="background-color:;"|
| style="text-align:left;"| United Russia
| 392,264
| 74.91
|  5.92%
| 15
|  1
| 17
|  1
| 32
|  0
|-
| style="background-color:;"|
| style="text-align:left;"| Communist Party
| 44,666
| 8.53
|  4.61%
| 2
|  0
| 0
| 
| 2
|  0
|-
| style="background-color:;"|
| style="text-align:left;"| Liberal Democratic Party
| 29,289
| 5.59
|  1.42%
| 1
|  0
| 1
|  1
| 2
|  1
|-
| colspan="11" style="background-color:#E9E9E9;"|
|-
| style="background-color:;"|
| style="text-align:left;"| Party of Pensioners
| 18,379
| 3.51
| New
| 0
| New
| 0
| New
| 0
| New
|-
| style="background-color:;"|
| style="text-align:left;"| A Just Russia — For Truth
| 17,268
| 3.30
|  2.16%
| 0
|  1
| 0
| 
| 0
|  1
|-
| style="background-color:;"|
| style="text-align:left;"| New People
| 15,078
| 2.88
| New
| 0
| New
| 0
| New
| 0
| New
|-
| style="text-align:left;" colspan="2"| Invalid ballots
| 6.675
| 1.27
|  0.30%
| —
| —
| —
| —
| —
| —
|- style="font-weight:bold"
| style="text-align:left;" colspan="2"| Total
| 523,621
| 100.00
| —
| 18
| 
| 18
| 
| 36
| 
|-
| colspan="11" style="background-color:#E9E9E9;"|
|-
| style="text-align:left;" colspan="2"| Turnout
| 523,621
| 50.95
|  0.01%
| —
| —
| —
| —
| —
| —
|-
| style="text-align:left;" colspan="2"| Registered voters
| 1,027,701
| 100.00
| —
| —
| —
| —
| —
| —
| —
|-
| colspan="11" style="background-color:#E9E9E9;"|
|- style="font-weight:bold"
| colspan="10" |Source:
|
|}

Incumbent Senator Yulia Lazutkina (United Russia) was re-appointed to the Federation Council.

See also
2022 Russian regional elections

References

Penza Oblast
Politics of Penza Oblast
Regional legislative elections in Russia